Alboino I della Scala ( – 29 November 1311) was the Scaliger Lord of Verona from 1304 until his death.

He was the son of Alberto I della Scala, and became seignior and imperial vicar in the city after the death of his brother Bartolomeo in 1304. In 1298 he had married Caterina Visconti, daughter of Matteo I Visconti; eight years later Alboino remarried with Betrice, daughter of Gilberto III da Correggio.

He was succeeded by the joint government of his son Alberto under the tutelage of his brother Cangrande. Alboino's younger son Mastino ruled Verona after the latter's death in 1329.

References

1291 births
1311 deaths
Lords of Verona
Alboino 1
14th-century Italian nobility